Ernst Rokosch (26 February 1889; date of death unknown) was a German footballer who played as a defender and made one appearance for the Germany national team.

Career
Rokosch earned his first and only cap for Germany on 5 April 1914 in a friendly against the Netherlands. The away match, which was played in Amsterdam, finished as a 4–4 draw.

Career statistics

International

References

External links
 
 
 
 
 

1889 births
Year of death missing
Footballers from Leipzig
German footballers
Germany international footballers
Association football defenders
SpVgg Leipzig players